At least two ships of the French Navy have been named Nestor:

  a  launched in 1793, renamed Cisalpin in 1797 and Aquilon 1803. Captured and burnt 1809
  a  launched in 1810 and broken up before 1865

French Navy ship names